Maria de' Medici (April 3, 1540 – November 19, 1557) was the eldest child of Cosimo I de' Medici, Grand Duke of Tuscany and Eleonora di Toledo. She was a member of the famous Medici family.

Life
She was engaged to Alfonso II, Duke of Ferrara, but died at the age of seventeen, before the marriage could take place. She was educated with her brothers and was among the brightest of the children. When her brother Francesco didn't understand his Greek lesson, his tutors called on Maria to explain it to him. Maria kept herself somewhat aloof from her younger brothers and sisters. She grew into an elegant, highly educated, and decorous young woman.

According to one unreliable legend, recounted in Edgcumbe Staley's The Tragedies of the Medici, Maria was lovely and kept closely guarded from men, but managed to meet a young lover, Malatesta de' Malatesti, in secret. According to the story, she was stabbed in the heart by her father after he caught the young lovers together. Cosimo then supposedly put out the story that she had died of a spotted fever and threw her young lover in prison.

Other more accurate accounts indicate that Maria's cause of death was probably malaria. She died in Livorno. Her father mourned for her deeply and kept her portrait in his bedroom until he died; he had now lost two of his daughters, Bia de' Medici—an illegitimate child born before Cosimo's marriage to Eleonora—being the other daughter. "She was of the same disposition as myself," said Cosimo, "and she was deprived of fresh air." Her sister Lucrezia di Cosimo de Medici later married Alfonso.

Portraits
Maike Vogt-Lüerssen argued in an article in Medicea – Rivista interdisciplinare di studi medicei that portraits of Maria have been misidentified by art historians during the past 500 years. She argued that a portrait by Bronzino that is usually identified as Maria depicts her younger half-sister Virginia de' Medici, while a Bronzino portrait of a young girl in a white dress depicts Maria rather than her older half-sister, Bia de' Medici. Vogt-Lüerssen also argued that a Bronzino portrait identified as an unknown noblewoman and her son is of a teenaged Maria and her younger brother, Antonio, both of whom died young. She identified the girl as Maria because of the similarity in facial features between the subjects of each of the latter two portraits.

Ancestry

Notes

References

Murphy, Caroline P. (2008). Murder of a Medici Princess. USA: Oxford University Press. 
Staley, Edgcumbe The Tragedies of the Medici
Schultes, Lothar (2017): "Der Tod und das Mädchen – Bia oder Maria de' Medici?" In: Mitteilungen der Gesellschaft für vergleichende Kunstforschung in Wien, 69, Nr. 1/2, February 2017, p. 1– 6.

1540 births
1557 deaths
Maria di Cosimo
Nobility from Florence
16th-century Italian nobility
Burials at San Lorenzo, Florence
Maria di Cosimo I de' Medici
Deaths from malaria
16th-century people of the Republic of Florence
16th-century Italian women
Daughters of monarchs